Kamrupi dance is group of dances originating in ancient Kamrup, forming one of the cultural norm of region.

Origin
Kamrupi dance originated from Bhaona dance.

Types
Phalguni, Gita, Karnarjuna along with others are variants of Kamrupi dance.

See also
 Kamrupi Dholiya
 Kamrupi Lokgeet
 Prachin Kamrupi Nritya Sangha

References

Kamrupi culture
Indian folk dances